Brother Anthony (born as Anthony Graham Teague 1942; Korean name An Sonjae (Hangul: 안선재)) is a translator, scholar, and member of the Taizé Community who has become a naturalized Korean citizen, and lives in Seoul.

Life

Brother Anthony of Taizé (An Sonjae) was born in 1942 in Cornwall, UK, to Thomas Leslie Teague (February 2, 1914 – March 26, 1985) and Nan Albina Green (July 24, 1911 – February 3, 1991). He studied Medieval and Modern languages at Oxford and In 1969 he joined the Taizé Community in France, a monastic order composed of men from the Protestant, Anglican and Catholic traditions dedicated to spreading the message of trust and reconciliation.

After three years' service in a Philippine slum, in May 1980, Brother Anthony joined other brothers in Korea, invited by the late Archbishop of Seoul, Cardinal Kim Sou-Hwan. He taught English literature at Sogang University, Seoul, for nearly three decades, while translating works of modern Korean literature and also writing books and articles about literature and translation.

Brother Anthony began to translate modern Korean literature in 1988, and since then has published a wide variety of works from such classic Korean authors as Ku Sang, Ko Un, Ch’on Sang-Pyong, So Chong-Ju, Kim Su-Yong, Shin Kyong-Nim, Yi Si-Young, Kim Kwang-Kyu, Ynhui Park, and Yi Mun-yol. In 1991 he won a Modern Korean Literature Translation Award from The Korea Times for his translation of "Headmaster Abe" by Ko Un, and he began serving as one of the contest judges in 1996, which he still does as of 2020. In 1994, Brother Anthony became a naturalized Korean citizen, taking on the Korean name An Sonjae, Sonjae being the Korean form of Sudhana, the 'little pilgrim' of the Buddhist scripture The Gandavyuha Sutra.

From January 2011 to December 2020 he served as president of the Royal Asiatic Society Korea Branch, tied for the longest term for an RAS Korea president. He was awarded the Korean government's Order of Cultural Merit, Jade Crown class, in October 2008 for his work in promoting knowledge of Korean literature in the world. He reached retirement age at the start of 2007 and is currently a professor emeritus of Sogang University and a chair-professor of Dankook University. In 2015 he received an MBE. He currently lives in Seoul.

Works
 Classical and Biblical Backgrounds to Western Literature. Seoul: Sogang University Press, 1989, Revised & expanded, 2000. 
 Literature in English Society before 1660: Volume One, The Middle Ages. Seoul: Sogang University Press, 1997 
 Literature in English Society: Part Two, The Renaissance 1485 - 1660. Seoul: Sogang University Press, 1998 
 Textual Criticism of Chaucer's Canterbury Tales. Brother Anthony and Lee Dong-Chun. Seoul: Seoul National University Press, 2002. 
 The Korean Way of Tea. By Brother Anthony of Taizé and Hong Kyeong-Hee. Seoul: Seoul Selection, 2007 
 Korean Tea Classics. By Brother Anthony of Taizé, Hong Kyeong-Hee and Steven D. Owyoung. Seoul: Seoul Selection, 2010
 Eerie Tales from Old Korea. Compiled by Brother Anthony of Taizé. Seoul: Seoul Selection, 2013
 Brief Encounters: Early Reports of Korea by Westerners. Compiled by Brother Anthony of Taizé and Robert Neff. Seoul: Seoul Selection, 2016
 Romantic Tales from Old Korea. Compiled by Brother Anthony of Taizé. Seoul: Seoul Selection, 2016

Translated works
Translations are from Korean into English unless otherwise indicated.

Poetry
 Ku Sang,	Wastelands of Fire // Wasteland Poems	Forest Books 1990 // DapGae 2000
 Ku Sang,	A Korean Century  (Christopher's River; Diary of the Fields) Forest Books 1991 (Out of print)
 Ku Sang,	Infant Splendor  (Online text and images) Samseong 1991 (Out of print)
 Kim Kwang-kyu,	Faint Shadows of Love	Forest Books 1991 (Out of print)
 Ko Un,	The Sound of my Waves	Cornell EAS 1991 // Cornell – DapGae
 Midang, So Chong-ju,	Early Lyrics	Forest Books 1991 // Cornell - DapGae 1998
 Ch'on Sang-pyong,	Back to Heaven	Cornell EAS 1995 // Cornell - DapGae 1996
 Ko Un,	What? : 108 Zen Poems (formerly Beyond Self)	Parallax (Berkeley) 2008 (1997)
 Shin Kyong-nim,	Farmers' Dance	Cornell - DapGae 1999
 Kim Su-young, Shin Kyong-nim, Lee Si-young	Variations	Cornell 2001 
 Ku Sang,	Even the Knots on Quince Trees Tell Tales	DapGae 2004
 Ku Sang,	Eternity Today	Seoul Selection 2005
 Kim Young-Moo,	Virtual Reality	DapGae 2005
 Kim Kwang-kyu,	The Depths of a Clam	White Pine Press 2005
 Ko Un,	Ten Thousand Lives	Green Integer (Los Angeles) 2005
 Kim Kwang-Kyu, A Journey to Seoul, DapGae 2006
 Ko Un, Flowers of a Moment, BOA 2006
 Chonggi Mah, Eyes of Dew, White Pine Press 2006
 Special Children, Poems for Planting Love, Seoul Selection 2008
 Ko Un, Songs for Tomorrow, Green Integer 2009
 Kim Yeong-Nang, Until Peonies Bloom, MerwinAsia 2010
 Kim Seung-Hee, Walking on a Washing Line, Cornell EAS 2011
 Ko Un, ChaRyong's Kiss (bilingual, poems for children about his daughter), Ba-u-sol 2011
 Ko Un, Himalaya Poems, Green Integer 2011
 Ko Un, First Person Sorrowful, Bloodaxe 2012
 (From the French) Brother Pierre Etienne, Selected Poems, Taize, 2013.
 Hong Yunsook, Sunlight in a Distant Place. Foreign Language Publications Ohio State U. 2013
 Ynhui Park, Shadows of the Void, Seoul Selection 2014
 Lee Si-Young, Patterns, Green Integer 2014
 Ko Un, Maninbo: Peace & War, Bloodaxe 2015
 Kim Soo-Bok	Beating on Iron	Green Integer 2015
 Anthology, The Colors of Dawn,	Manoa, 2016
 Do Jong-Hwan, No Flower Blooms Without Wavering, Seoul Selection, 2016
 Oh Sae-Young, Night Sky Checkerboard, Phoneme Media, 2016
 Shim Bo-Seon, Fifteen Seconds without Sorrow, Parlor Press, 2016
 Jeong Ho-Seung,	A Letter Not Sent, Seoul Selection  2016
 Jeong Ho-Seung, Though flowers fall, I have never forgotten you, Seoul Selection  2016
 Ko Hyeong-Ryeol, Grasshoppers' Eyes,	Parlor Press. 2017
 Lee Seong-Bok, Ah, Mouthless Things, Green Integer 2017
 Ko Un, Poems by Ko Un, Asia 2017
 Ahn Do-Hyun,	Poems by Ahn Do-Hyun, Asia 2017
 Kim Jong-Gil, A Black Kite,	MerwinAsia  2017
 Ahn Sang-Hak,	Poems by Ahn Sang-Hak,	Asia 2018
 Kim Sa-in, Liking in Silence, White Pine. 2019
 Yoo Anjin, As I Walk Alone, MerwinAsia  2020
 An Hyeon-mi, Deep Work, Asia 2020
 Kim Seung-Hee, Hope is Lonely, Arc 2020
 Ahn Joo-cheol, Feeling Never Stops, Asia 2020
 Kim Soo-yeol	Homo Maskus,	Asia 2020

Fiction
 Yi Mun-yol,	The Poet	Harvill Press 1994 / Vintage 2001
 Lee Oyoung,	The General's Beard / Phantom Legs	Homa & Sekey 2002
  Ko Un,	Little Pilgrim	Parallax (Berkeley) 2005
  Bang Hyeon-seok,	Off to Battle at Dawn.  Translated with Dafna Zur. 	Asia Publishers, Bilingual Edition 2013
  Yi Mun-yol,	Son of Man.   	Dalkey Archive 2015
  J. M. G. Le Clézio, Bitna: Under the Sky of Seoul	Seoul Selection (USA) 2017
  Jeong Ho-seung,	Loving.   	Seoul Selection 2020
  Jeong Ho-seung,	Lonesome Jar.   	Seoul Selection 2020

Non-fiction
 Mok Sun-Ok, My Husband the Poet, Seoul Selection 2006
 (From the French) Daniel de Montmollin, The Practice of Stoneware Glazes: minerals, rocks, ashes. Paris: La Revue de la Ceramique et du Verre. 2005.

Awards
 The Korea Times Translation Award (1991)
 Daesan Translation Award (1995)
 Korean Republic's Literary Award
 Korean PEN Translation Award
 Korean government's Order of Cultural Merit, Jade Crown class, in October 2008.

References

External links
 Brother Anthony's home page
 An interview with Brother Anthony on Notebook on Cities and Culture

1942 births
Living people
Korean–English translators
Naturalized citizens of South Korea
British emigrants to South Korea
South Korean people of British descent
South Korean translators
Academic staff of Sogang University